Breil is a former commune in the Maine-et-Loire department in western France. On 15 December 2016, it was merged into the new commune Noyant-Villages. Breil's nearest town is Noyant (6 km).

Population

The inhabitants are known as Breillois.

Sights
Breil is most famous for its Chateau in the Parc du Lathan, where a major Fête de la Chasse (Hunting Fair) is held each August 15.  Breil is near the Lac de Rillé, a lake stretching from Rillé to Gué Morin,a hamlet in Breil, where the River Lathan was dammed in 1978 principally for irrigating the valley of the Authion.

See also
Communes of the Maine-et-Loire department

References

Former communes of Maine-et-Loire